The Congress of Oaxaca is the legislature of Oaxaca, a state of Mexico. The Congress is unicameral.

Electoral system
There are 42 seats, 25 deputies are elected with first-past-the-post in single-member districts and 17 are elected through proportional representation. The chamber is renewed every three years.

Authority
The laws and powers of the Congress are stated in Title 4, Chapter II of the Political Constitution of the Free and Sovereign State of Oaxaca.

Location
The Congress is located in the municipality of San Raymundo Jalpan in the metropolitan area of the city of Oaxaca de Juárez.

See also
List of Mexican state congresses

References

Government of Oaxaca
Oaxaca
Oaxaca